Gorch Fock I (ex Tovarishch, ex Gorch Fock) is a German three-mast barque, the first of a series built as school ships for the German Reichsmarine in 1933.

She was taken as war reparations by the Soviet Union after World War II and renamed Tovarishch.  The ship was acquired by sponsors, after a short period under the Ukrainian flag in the 1990s and a prolonged stay in British ports due to lack of funds for necessary repairs.

Then she sailed to her original home port of Stralsund where her original name of Gorch Fock was restored on 29 November 2003. She is a museum ship, and extensive repairs were carried out in 2008.

The Federal German government built a replacement training ship  which is still in service.

History and details
The German school ship Niobe, a three-masted barque, capsized on 26 July 1932 in the Baltic Sea near Fehmarn due to a sudden squall, killing 69. The loss prompted the German Navy to order a new training vessel built. Flags were lowered to half-mast from Flensburg to Konstanz as a public outpouring of grief gripped the nation. The Prussian State Mint issued a Niobe memorial coin to help raise money for a replacement ship, and soon earned 200,000 Reichsmarks towards the effort.

A request for proposal went out to all the major shipyards, including Deutsche Werke, Howaldtswerke, and Germaniawerft for the "Project 1115 Replacement Niobe". Joh. C. Tecklenborg, who had built one of Germany's previous training ships, Grossherzog Friedrich August, had just gone out of business and was unable to compete. Dr Wilhelm Süchting's design for Blohm+Voss, who had also built the German training ship, Prinzess Eitel Friedrich, won the bid, and construction began at their yard in Hamburg on 2 December 1932. She was completed in a record 100 days. 

On 3 May 1933 the ship was launched and named Gorch Fock in honor of German writer Johann Kinau, who wrote under the pseudonym "Gorch Fock". Kinau had died in the 1916 Battle of Jutland aboard the cruiser . 10,000 spectators attended Gorch Fock's launching, including Johann Kinau's mother. The launching was presided by Admiral Erich Raeder, and christened by Marie Fröhlich of the "German Woman's Fleet Association", with the Karlsruhe on station as a guard of honor.

Commissioned by the German Navy on 26 June 1933, Gorch Fock is a three-masted barque. She has square sails on the fore and main masts, and is gaff rigged on the mizzen. She has a displacement at full load of 1510 tons.

The training ship was designed to be robust and safe against capsizing. More than 300 tons of steel ballast in the keel give her a righting moment large enough to bring her back in the upright position even when she heels over to nearly a 90°.

Gorch Fock served as a training vessel for the German Reichsmarine prior to World War II. During the war, she was a stationary office ship in Stralsund, until she was officially reactivated on 19 April 1944. On 1 May 1945, the crew scuttled her in shallow waters off Rügen in an attempt to avoid her capture by the Soviets, who already had fired at her for 45 minutes with tanks.

The Soviets ordered Stralsund-based company "B. Staude Schiffsbergung" to raise and salvage her, which after some difficulties was done in 1947 at a cost of 800,000 Reichsmark (equivalent to  million  euros). She was under restoration between 1948 and 1950. She was then named Tovarishch (Russian for "Comrade") in 1951 and put into service as a training vessel. Her new home port was Odessa. She participated in many Tall Ships' Races and cruised far and wide on the seven seas. She made a voyage around the world in 1957 and won the Operation Sail race twice, in 1974 and 1976.

After the dissolution of the Soviet Union in 1991, Tovarishch sailed under the Ukrainian flag (home port Kherson) until 1993, when she needed repairs and was deactivated for lack of funds. In 1995, she sailed from Kherson to Newcastle-upon-Tyne, where private sponsors wanted to have her repaired. This failed because of the high costs, and in 1999, the ship was transported to Wilhelmshaven, where she stayed in dock for four years until finally transferred to Stralsund in 2003. On 29 November 2003 the ship was re-christened Gorch Fock.

As of 2011 the ship is in poor but stable condition. There is about six million dollars worth of restoration work required to bring this ship back to sailing condition. The museum had a dismal tourist season, resulting in a fifty thousand dollar loss in revenue from previous years. This has forced a layoff of five workers.

Sister ships

The design of Gorch Fock proved highly successful. She was the first of a series of five sister ships built by Blohm & Voss, and a number of South American school ships are also based on the same design. Of the three original sister ships, only  is an exact replica of Gorch Fock.

USCGC Eagle (ex Horst Wessel)

Horst Wessel was launched in 1936—the growing Reichsmarine needed more school ships. Her home port was Kiel. At the end of World War II, she became one of several war reparations and was assigned to the United States. After some repairs in Wilhelmshaven and Bremerhaven, she was sailed by her German crew including the Captain together with American sailors to her new home port of New London, Connecticut. Since then, she has sailed under the name  for the United States Coast Guard.

Sagres (ex Albert Leo Schlageter)

Albert Leo Schlageter was launched on 30 October 1937. She was confiscated by the United States after World War II and then sold to Brazil, where she sailed as a school ship under the name Guanabara. In 1961, the Portuguese Navy bought her to replace the previous school ship Sagres (which was later transferred to Hamburg, where she is a museum ship under her original name Rickmer Rickmers). The Portuguese named her  also. She still sails as of 2015, having completed a circumnavigation on 24 December 2010.

Mircea

 was built by Blohm & Voss for the Romanian Navy. She was launched in 1938 and has always sailed under the Romanian flag (except for a short period after World War II, when she was confiscated by the Soviet Union). She is the only one of the sister ships that is truly identical to Gorch Fock. She was overhauled at the Blohm & Voss shipyards in Hamburg in 1966, and she still sails .

Herbert Norkus
Named after the Hitler Youth martyr Herbert Norkus, another ship of the Gorch Fock design—with the same dimensions as Horst Wessel—was begun at the Blohm & Voss shipyard. However, the unfinished ship had to be launched prematurely on 7 November 1939 because the slipway had to be cleared to build submarines. The hull stayed in the harbor of Hamburg throughout World War II. It was damaged in a bomb raid in 1945, and instead of being sold to Brazil as had been considered, ended up being filled with gas grenades and sunk in the Skagerrak in 1947.

The yards, which had been prepared, but not yet mounted, and the tackle, which had not yet been rigged, were later used for Gorch Fock built in 1958.

Gorch Fock

As Germany had lost all of its training vessels as war reparations after World War II, the West German Bundesmarine decided in 1957 to have a new training ship built following the plans for Gorch Fock. The new ship was a modernized rebuild of Horst Wessel.

The modern-day  was launched on 23 August 1958 and commissioned on 17 December of that year.

Latin American ships
A number of similar ships have been built by the Astilleros Celaya S.A. shipyard in Bilbao for Latin American Navies, possibly following the Blohm & Voss design. The hulls and rigging of these ships are very similar, the main differences are in the superstructure and they also have larger tanks for both diesel and water, and they are also longer.

References

External links

 The correct homepage of "Gorch Fock 1"  
 ESYS page on the whole family of ships (in German).
 ESYS page with links to the five original ships (in German).
 JanMaat—another German site on the Gorch Fock (ex Tovarishch).

Barques
Museum ships in Germany
Individual sailing vessels
Sailing ships of Germany
Ships built in Hamburg
Auxiliary ships of the Soviet Navy
Ships of Ukraine
Three-masted ships
Tall ships of Germany
1933 ships
Gorch Fock-class sailing ships